2067 is a 2004 album by Rheostatics. It was the band's first album with longtime producer Michael Phillip Wojewoda as an official member, as well as its final studio album for 15 years. The album was billed as a concept album imagining Canada on the 200th anniversary of Canadian Confederation in 1867, although this concept is only loosely evident in the album itself.

The album was released on True North Records. It contains a hidden track which is officially billed as a "mystery song"; it is in fact a revamped synthpop version of one of the band's first notable singles, "Record Body Count" (from 1991's Melville).

The first single from the album was "Marginalized". The second single, "The Tarleks", was loosely inspired by the character of Herb Tarlek from the 1970s sitcom WKRP in Cincinnati. Frank Bonner, who played Tarlek in the series, reprises that role in the WorldFest-Houston Gold Award-winning video.

Track listing

References

2004 albums
Rheostatics albums
True North Records albums
Albums produced by Michael Phillip Wojewoda